Accused is a British television legal drama series, starring Nicholas R. Bailey, that first broadcast on 3 November 1996. Each episode follows a single case in a busy magistrates' court. A single run of eight episodes aired throughout November and December 1996 on BBC1, airing in a late night slot on Sundays, before moving to Mondays midway through the series. The series was produced by Diana Kyle, and co-starred Davyd Harries, Marlene Sidaway, Lloyd Johnston and David Telfer.

Cast
 Nicholas R. Bailey as Jack Vincent
 Davyd Harries as Derek Gravett
 Marlene Sidaway as Dee Yearwood
 Lloyd Johnston as Paul Harper
 David Telfer as Gerry Harrison
 Kate Lynn Evans as Susan Bellamy
 Frances Grey as Jenny Roach
 Beverly Hills as Liz Walton
 Geoffrey Hutchings as Dan Chapman
 Peggy Sinclair as Jocelyn Halliday

Episodes

References

External links

1996 British television series debuts
1996 British television series endings
1990s British drama television series
BBC television dramas
1990s British legal television series
1990s British television miniseries
English-language television shows
Television shows set in London